Hymenoclea is a genus of moths in the family Sesiidae.

Species
Hymenoclea palmii (Beutenmüller, 1902)

References

Sesiidae